= Tennis Round =

Online Platform for Tennis Players and Courts in United States

- Type: Private
- Industry: Internet; Service Marketplace,
- Founded: 2009
- Key people: Alexander Marinov, CEO & Founder; Nikolay Tchaouchev, Chief Creative Officer & Founder; Martin Marinov, Marketing Manager & Founder; Hristo Gyoshev, Strategic Advisor & Founder
- Website: tennisround.com

Tennis Round is a company that provides an online platform for connecting tennis players and finding tennis courts anywhere in the United States. Players can search for both casual and competitive tennis opponents and send invitations to schedule matches at the local tennis courts. Tennis Round was founded in April 2009. Tennis Round has six co-founders and is a privately held company with offices in San Francisco, CA and Seattle, WA.

== Background ==
The idea was born in February 2007 in Miami Beach, Florida. The co-founder Alexander Marinov had just moved from San Francisco to Miami and couldn't find any compatible tennis players to play with locally. This resulted in the idea of an online platform where tennis players could search and interact with a compatible partner in their local area. Marinov then decided to create a website that would connect tennis players not just in Miami, but also everywhere in the United States.

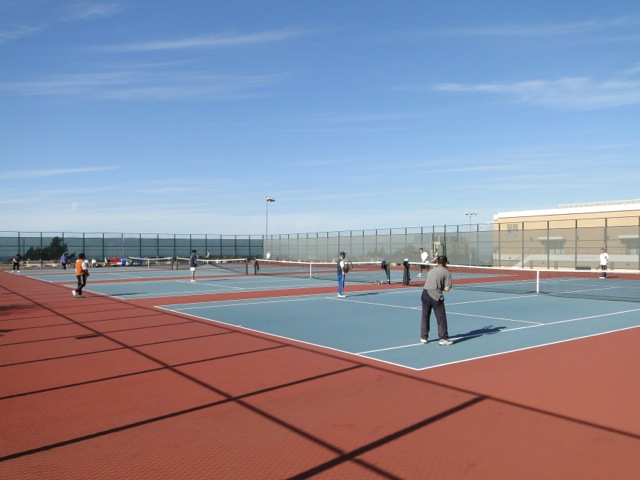
Tennis Round Registered Players Practicing in st Ignatius college preparatory Tennis Courts

== Description ==
Tennis Round is among a number of companies in the United States which provides an online tennis platform that allows players to find local courts and find other compatible tennis players. It has registered recreational tennis players from 600 cities and mapped over 16,000 private and public facilities with nearly 100,000 tennis courts in 4,200 cities nationwide in the United States. Tennis can be played at both public and private tennis courts. Public tennis courts are free of cost, but some require a small fee for reservation or usage of the tennis court. Usually the private courts have a policy for drop-ins or have a daily pass for non-members.

The availability of these locations can be checked via Tennis Round or getting directly in touch with community centers, tennis facilities or country clubs.

== Website ==
The website was launched in August 2010. Tennis Round posts information regarding locations of tennis courts anywhere in the United States. There are over 1200 registered members and growing. The registered members can view other player's profile picture, tennis skill level and favorite tennis courts. They can also search for compatible tennis opponents and send invitations to schedule matches. The website allows users to search tennis facilities by zip code and city. It also provides tennis leagues for competitive tennis players.

== Financing ==
Tennis Round offers a free service of becoming a member. Competitive tennis players can join a fee-based tennis league.
